Sergey Vladimirovich Golovanov (born 25 July 1968  in Saransk, Republic of Mordovia) is a priest of the Russian Greek Catholic Church of the Byzantine Rite.

Biography

Early life, education and military service
He was born in a Russian intellectual agnostic family. His father Vladimir was a  Doctor of Technical Science and lecturer in Mordovian State University. Sergey was baptized in the village Sivin (Krasnoslobodkiy area of Mordovia) by his Russian Eastern Orthodox grandmother in 1973. It was an era marked by Communist ideas opposed to religion. He left secondary school № 33 in 1985 and worked as a turner at an engineering plant in Saransk.

In 1986-1988 he served as a soldier in a regiment of the Soviet Armed Forces near Khabarovsk. In 1988 he entered the preparation department of Mordovian State University. In 1989  he entered the History faculty of the university and specialized in Finno-Ugric ethnography.

Religious conversion and study
In 1988 he came to Orthodox Christianity and attended Divine Liturgy in the Orthodox Cathedral of St. John in Saransk. In 1990 he studied theology under the direction of the Vicar Fr. Andrey Udovenko. At the end of 1990, Fr. Udovenko left Russian Orthodoxy and converted to Catholicism of the Byzantine Rite. In January 1991, Fr. Andrey convinced Golovanov to follow him, and christmated him.

In February 1992 after a long process of spiritual conflicts in relation to his former denomination, Golovanov went to Ukraine, where he met Ukrainian Catholic bishop Iriney Bilyk OSBM, who showed him the importance of two Eastern hierarchs - Ukrainian Catholic Church Metropolitan bishop Andrey Sheptytsky and the Russian Catholic Exarch Leonid Feodorov. Both were interested in the reunification of Roman Catholicism and Russian Orthodoxy.

In May 1992 he married a music teacher, Iryna, and at the same year was invited to help in pastoral work for worshipers belonging to the Byzantine Rite in Siberia by Roman Catholic missionary Fr. Joseph Swidnitsky.

In 1993 he was visiting young scholar at the Institute for Russian and East European Studies in Helsinki. In 1992-1994 he studied Catholic theology at the Theological faculty of  Ivano-Frankivsk Theology Catechetical Institute of the Ukrainian Greek Catholic Church in Ivano-Frankivsk (Ukraine).

Ordination and priesthood
Golovanov was ordained a Catholic priest of the Byzantine rite in 1994 by Ukrainian Catholic bishop Sofron Dmyterko, OSBM and directed to Siberia with mission on Fr. Swidnitsky's invitation.

From September 1994, he worked as a missionary priest for Ukrainian Catholics in Western Siberia with residence in Sargatskoye, Omsk Oblast.

In October 1995 he founded a mission in Omsk for traditional Ukrainian Catholics of the Byzantine rite, who live in Siberia as a result of the deportations after World War II. After an evaluation period he was recognized in February 1997 by the Roman Catholic Bishop of Novosibirsk, Joseph Werth SJ, and named vicar in 1997, responsible by Latin and Byzantine Catholics in northern part of Omsk Oblast. Then he was named visitor for Byzantine Catholics over Siberia in 1998, dean of Omsk Roman Catholic deanery  in 1999, member of Board of Priests in 2001, and rector of Latin and Byzantine churches in 2004.

In 2001 he undertook further studies in Catholic theology and the history of the Church at the Catholic University of Eichstätt-Ingolstadt (Germany). He began the research project “The Prosopology of Famous Byzantine Women during the Paleologue Period, 13th-15th centuries” under the supervision of Prof. Johannes Hofmann.

Between 2001 and 2005 he completed the research project A History of the Russian Catholic Apostolate outside the USSR in 1922-1991.

From 2000-2006 he worked as an educational specialist and head of department in the Catholic relief organization Caritas Internationalis in Omsk.

With the religious freedom experienced after the fall of Communism, there were calls from the small number of Russian Catholics to appoint an Exarch to the long existing vacancy. Such a move would have been strongly objected to by the Russian Orthodox Church, causing the Holy See to not act out of concern for damaging ecumenism.

In August 2004, however, the Vatican's hand was forced when a convocation of Russian Catholic priests met in Sargatskoye, Omsk Oblast and used their rights under canon law to elect Father Sergey Golovanov as temporary Exarch and appealed to Pope John Paul II to either recognize their decision or to appoint another Exarch.

In December 2004, Pope John Paul II moved quickly to replace Father Sergey with Bishop Joseph Werth, the Latin Church Apostolic Administrator of Siberia, based in Novosibirsk. Bishop Werth was appointed by Pope John Paul II as Ordinary for all non-Armenian Rite Eastern Catholics in the Russian Federation.

Bishop Joseph Werth SJ then dismissed Fr. Golovanov from all duties within the Roman Catholic diocese of Novosibirsk.

At the end 2005, Golovanov was dismissed from all pastoral work in Russia by Bishop Werth SJ and worked as a journalist and translator. From 2006-2007, he worked as a security watchman in a private security company.

Since June 2007 he served as an archivist and chaplain in the Diocesan Office of the Roman Catholic Diocese in Novosibirsk, under Bishop Joseph Werth, SJ. Since October he is a visiting researcher at the Institute of Philosophy and Law at the Siberian Branch of the Russian Academy of Sciences in Novosibirsk. He works at his PhD degree thesis, “The eschatology of Gregory the Great according to his Moralia in Hiob”, under the supervision of Prof. Eugene Afonasin. In August 2009 he took part in the 5th Russian Philosophy Congress in Novosibisk.

On 30 June 2009 he was dismissed from his office by Bishop Werth and called from Russia by authorities of the Ukrainian Greek Catholic Church (UGCC). Now he lives in Omsk and translates the liturgical works of Fr. Robert Taft SJ.

He continues trying to reestablish the Russian Catholic Apostolic Exarchate of Russia, which has been vacant since 1951.

Family 
Father Golovanov is married to a former teacher, Irina. They have two daughters and two sons.

References

External links
 Vselenstvo (old personal page in Russian)
 Good Works (current personal page in Russian)
 Blog (in Russian)

Russian Eastern Catholics
Converts to Eastern Catholicism from Eastern Orthodoxy
Former Russian Orthodox Christians
People from Saransk
1968 births
Living people